Subhashis Chakraborty is elected as member of the Rajya Sabha from West Bengal as an AITC candidate.

References

Rajya Sabha members from West Bengal
Trinamool Congress politicians from West Bengal
Living people
Year of birth missing (living people)